Britt Eerland (born 22 February 1994) is a Dutch table tennis player.

She competed at the 2016 Summer Olympics as part of the Dutch team in the women's team event and is also competing in the 2020 Summer Olympics.

External links
 Official web page

References

1994 births
Living people
Dutch female table tennis players
Olympic table tennis players of the Netherlands
Table tennis players at the 2016 Summer Olympics
Table tennis players at the 2010 Summer Youth Olympics
European Games medalists in table tennis
Table tennis players at the 2015 European Games
Table tennis players at the 2019 European Games
European Games silver medalists for the Netherlands
Table tennis players at the 2020 Summer Olympics
21st-century Dutch women